Ermenc is a surname. Notable people with the surname include:

Alenka Ermenc (born 1963), Slovenian general
John Ermenc (1887–1946), American politician

Slovene-language surnames